Sarezzo (locally ) is a comune in the province of Brescia, in Lombardy. It is located in the Trompia valley. Neighbouring communes are Lumezzane, Villa Carcina, Polaveno and Gardone Val Trompia.  In 2011 its population was 13,547. The comune is made of four frazioni (villages): Sarezzo, Zanano, Ponte Zanano, and Noboli, although today these have grown into each other and there is no visible distinction. Indeed, Sarezzo, 13 km from the city centre of Brescia, is today part its urban area (population 350,000).

History
In 2006 Hina Saleem was murdered by her father in his house in the town.

Twin towns
Sarezzo is twinned with:

  Oberhaslach, France

References

External links
The web portal of Sarezzo